The Alps are a San Francisco, California-based folk and electronic group made up of Alexis Georgopoulos, Jefre Cantu-Ledesma and Scott Hewicker.

Discography

Albums
Jewelt Gambles/Spirit Shambles (Spekk, 2006)
III (Type, 2008)
Le Voyage (Type, 2010)
Easy Action (Mexican Summer, 2011)

References

External links

Musical groups from San Francisco